Panissage is a former commune in the Isère department in southeastern France. On 1 January 2019, it was merged into the new commune Val-de-Virieu.

Geography
The Bourbre forms the commune's southeastern border.

Population

See also
Communes of the Isère department

References

Former communes of Isère
Isère communes articles needing translation from French Wikipedia